Boris Isaakovitch Utin (1832–1872) was a professor at Saint Petersburg University. He was sympathetic to the student movement in Russia and resigned during the student unrest of 1861, afterwards becoming a lawyer and a member of the Saint Petersburg District Court and the Saint Petersburg Court of Justice. 

His close friendship with Karolina Pavlova inspired a number of her poems.

Selected publications 
 Über die Ehrenverletzung nach russischem Recht
 О мировой юстиции и самоуправлении в Англии ("On world justice and self-government in England"), 1860
 Очерк исторического образования суда присяжных в Англии ("Essay on the historical formation of the jury in England"), 1860
 Судебная реформа ("Judicial Reform"), 1862

References

Bibliography 
 
 
 
 
 

Academic staff of Saint Petersburg State University
Lawyers from Saint Petersburg
1832 births
1872 deaths